Torrence Douglas Parsons (1941–1987) was an American mathematician.

He worked mainly in graph theory, and is known for introducing a graph-theoretic view of pursuit–evasion problems (Parsons 1976, 1978). He obtained his Ph.D. from Princeton University in 1966 under the supervision of Albert W. Tucker.

Selected publications

Notes

Further reading
Memorial articles in
Journal of Graph Theory vol. 12
Discrete Mathematics vol. 78

1941 births
1987 deaths
20th-century American mathematicians
Graph theorists
Princeton University alumni